Tojonirina Alain Andriantsitohaina (born 26 February 1995) is a Malagasy weightlifter. He is a four-time medalist, including three golds, at the African Weightlifting Championships.

In 2019, he represented Madagascar at the African Games held in Rabat, Morocco. In 2021, he finished in 11th place in the men's 67 kg event at the 2020 Summer Olympics in Tokyo, Japan.

His brother Éric Andriantsitohaina is also a competitive weightlifter.

References

External links
 

Living people
1995 births
Place of birth missing (living people)
Malagasy male weightlifters
African Games competitors for Madagascar
Competitors at the 2019 African Games
Weightlifters at the 2020 Summer Olympics
Olympic weightlifters of Madagascar
African Weightlifting Championships medalists